The 1928 Halifax by-election was a parliamentary by-election held on 13 July 1928 for the British House of Commons constituency of Halifax in the West Riding of Yorkshire.

The seat had become vacant when the constituency's Member of Parliament (MP), John Henry Whitley, the Speaker of the House of Commons since 1921, had resigned his seat due to ill-health. He had been elected as a Liberal Party MP at the 1900 general election, and as speaker had been returned unopposed at the general elections in 1922, 1923 and 1924.  The last time that there had been a contested election for the seat was at the 1918 general election, when Whitley had been opposed only by a Socialist Labour Party candidate.

The result of the three-way contest was a victory for the Labour candidate, Arthur Longbottom, who won with a majority of 4,951 over the Liberal Harry Barnes, who had previously been MP for Newcastle upon Tyne East. Longbottom had previously been a councillor in Halifax and served as its mayor in 1923.

Result

Aftermath
At the following year's general election Longbottom held the seat with an increased majority of 7,063 votes. That contest also saw a new Conservative candidate, Gilbert Gledhill overtake the Liberals and move into second place. In 1931, Gledhill took the seat for the Conservatives, defeating Longbottom by over 20,000 votes.

See also
Halifax, West Yorkshire
List of United Kingdom by-elections (1918–1931)

References

1928 in England
By-elections to the Parliament of the United Kingdom in West Yorkshire constituencies
1928 elections in the United Kingdom
Elections in Calderdale
Halifax, West Yorkshire
1920s in Yorkshire
July 1928 events